The Second Musa cabinet was formed on 27 March 2004, a few day after Musa Aman was re-appointed as the Chief Minister of Sabah.

Full members 
The present Cabinet of Sabah were formed on 27 March 2004 as a result of victory of Barisan Nasional in the 12th state election. 10 members of the State Legislative Assembly have been appointed as ministers on that day.

 UMNO (6)
 PBS (2)
 SAPP (1)
 LDP (1)
 UPKO (1)

Assistant ministers 
Assistant ministers, being a member of the Legislative Assembly but not that of the Cabinet, are deputies to a respective minister and the second-in-command of their respective ministry. 14 members of the 16th State Legislative Assembly have been appointed as assistant ministers on 27 March 2004.

 UMNO (7)
 PBS (4)
 SAPP (1)
 MCA (1)
 UPKO (1)

See also 
 List of Yang di-Pertua Negeri of Sabah
 List of Chief Ministers of Sabah
 Sabah State Legislative Assembly
 Sabah State Government

References 

Sabah
Government of Sabah
Cabinets established in 2004